This is a list of schools in Cambridgeshire, England.

State-funded schools

Primary schools

Abbots Ripton CE Primary School, Huntingdon
Alconbury CE Primary School, Huntingdon
Alderman Jacobs School, Whittlesey
Alderman Payne Primary School, Wisbech St Mary
All Saints Interchurch Academy, March
Arbury Primary School, Cambridge
The Ashbeach Primary School, Huntingdon
Babraham CE Primary School, Cambridge
Bar Hill Community Primary School, Cambridge
Barnabas Oley CE Primary School, Great Gransden
Barrington CE Primary School, Barrington
Barton CE Primary School, Barton
Bassingbourn Primary School, Bassingbourn
Beaupre Community Primary School, Outwell
The Bellbird Primary School, Sawston
Benwick Primary School, Benwick
Bewick Bridge Community Primary School, Cambridge
Bottisham Primary School, Bottisham
Bourn CE Primary Academy, Bourn 
Brampton Village Primary School, Brampton
Brington CE Primary School, Brington
Buckden CE Primary School, Buckden
Burrough Green CE Primary School, Burrough Green
Burrowmoor Primary School, March
Burwell Village College (Primary), Burwell
Bury CE Primary School, Bury
Bushmead Primary School, St Neots
Caldecote Primary School, Caldecote
Castle Camps CE Primary School, Castle Camps
Cavalry Primary Primary School, March
Cherry Hinton CE Primary School, Cherry Hinton
Chesterton Primary School, Chesterton
Cheveley CE Primary School, Cheveley
Clarkson Infants School, Wisbech
Coates Primary School, Coates
Colville Primary School, Cherry Hinton
Coton CE Primary School, Coton
Cottenham Primary School, Cottenham
Cromwell Academy, Huntingdon
Cromwell Community College, Chatteris
Crosshall Infant School Academy, Eaton Ford
Crosshall Junior School, Eaton Ford
Ditton Lodge Primary School, Newmarket
Downham Feoffees Primary Academy, Little Downham
Dry Drayton CE Primary School, Dry Drayton
Duxford CE Community Primary School, Duxford
Earith Primary School, Earith
Eastfield Infant School, St Ives
Elm CE Primary School, Elm
Elm Road Primary School, Wisbech
Elsworth CE Primary School, Elsworth
The Elton CE Primary School of the Foundation of Frances and Jane Proby, Elton
Ely St John's Community Primary School, Ely
Ely St Mary's CE Junior School, Queen Adelaide
Ermine Street Church Academy, Alconbury Weald
Eynesbury CE Primary School, Eynesbury
Farcet CE Primary School, Farcet
Fawcett Primary School, Trumpington
Fen Ditton Primary School, Fen Ditton
Fen Drayton Primary School, Fen Drayton
Fenstanton and Hilton Primary School, Fenstanton
Folksworth CE Primary School, Folksworth
Fordham CE Primary School, Fordham
Fourfields Community Primary School, Yaxley
Fowlmere Primary School, Fowlmere
Foxton Primary School, Foxton
Friday Bridge Community Primary School, Friday Bridge 
Fulbourn Primary School, Fulbourn
The Galfrid School, Cambridge
Gamlingay Village Primary, Gamlingay
Girton Glebe Primary School, Girton
Glebelands Primary Academy, Chatteris
Godmanchester Bridge Academy, Godmanchester
Godmanchester Community Academy, Godmanchester
Gorefield Primary Academy, Gorefield
Great Abington Primary School, Great Abington
Great and Little Shelford CE Primary School, Great Shelford
Great Gidding CE Primary School, Great Gidding
Great Paxton CE Primary School, Great Paxton
Great Staughton Primary Academy, Great Staughton
Great Wilbraham CE Primary School, Great Wilbraham
The Grove Primary School, King's Hedges
Guilden Morden CE Primary Academy, Guilden Morden
Guyhirn CE Primary School, Guyhirn
Hardwick and Cambourne Community Primary School, Hardwick/Cambourne
Harston and Newton Community Primary School, Harston
Hartford Infant School, Hartford
Hartford Junior School, Hartford
Haslingfield Endowed Primary School, Haslingfield
Hatton Park Primary School, Longstanton
Hauxton Primary School, Hauxton
Hemingford Grey Primary School, Hemingford Grey
Histon and Impington Infant School, Impington
Histon and Impington Junior School, Histon
Holme CE Primary School, Holme
Holywell CE Primary School, Needingworth
Houghton Primary School, Houghton
Huntingdon Primary School, Huntingdon
The Icknield Primary School, Sawston
Isle of Ely Primary School, Ely
Isleham CE Primary School, Isleham
Jeavons Wood Primary School, Cambourne
Kennett Primary School, Kennett
Kettlefields Primary School, Stetchworth
Kimbolton Primary Academy, Kimbolton
Kinderley Primary School, Tydd St Giles
Kings Hedges Primary School, Cambridge
Kingsfield Primary School, Chatteris
Lantern Community Primary School, Ely
Leverington Primary Academy, Leverington
Linton CE Infant School, Linton
Linton Heights Junior School, Linton
Lionel Walden Primary School, Doddington
Little Paxton Primary School, Little Paxton
Little Thetford CE Primary School, Little Thetford
Littleport Community Primary School, Littleport
Longstanton Primary School, Longstanton
Manea Community Primary School, Manea
Marleigh Primary Academy, Cambridge
Mayfield Primary School, Cambridge
Meadow Primary School, Balsham
Melbourn Primary School, Melbourn
Meldreth Primary School, Meldreth
Mepal and Witcham CE Primary School, Mepal
Meridian Primary School, Comberton
Middlefield Primary Academy, Eynesbury
Millfield Primary School, Littleport
Milton CE Primary School, Milton
Milton Road Primary school, Cambridge
Monkfield Park Primary School, Cambourne
Morley Memorial Primary School, Cambridge
Murrow Primary Academy, Murrow
The Nene Infant School, Wisbech
New Road Primary School, Whittlesey
Newnham Croft Primary School, Cambridge
The Newton Community Primary School, Eltisley
Oakington CE Primary School, Oakington
Offord Primary School, Offord D'Arcy
Orchard Park Community Primary School, Orchard Park
Orchards CE Academy, Wisbech
Over Primary School, Over
Park Lane Primary School, Whittlesey
Park Street CE Primary School, Cambridge
The Pathfinder CE Primary School, Northstowe
Peckover Primary School, Wisbech
Pendragon Community Primary School, Papworth Everard
Petersfield CE Primary School, Orwell
Priory Junior School, St Neots
Queen Edith Primary School, Cambridge
Queen Emma Primary School, Cambridge
The Rackham CE Primary School, Witchford
Ramnoth Junior School, Wisbech
Ramsey Junior School, Ramsey
Ramsey Spinning Infant School, Ramsey
Ridgefield Primary School, Cambridge
Robert Arkenstall Primary School, Haddenham
The Round House Primary Academy, St Neots
St Alban's RC Primary School, Cambridge
St Andrew's CE Primary School, Soham
St Anne's CE Primary School, Godmanchester
St Helen's Primary School, Bluntisham
St Johns CE Primary School, Huntingdon
St Laurence RC Primary School, Cambridge
St Luke's CE Primary School, Cambridge
St Mary's CE Primary School, St Neots
St Matthew's Primary School, Cambridge
St Pauls CE Primary School, Cambridge
St Peter's CE Junior School, Wisbech
St Philip's CE School, Cambridge
Sawtry Infants' School, Sawtry
Sawtry Junior Academy, Sawtry
The Shade Primary School, Soham
Shirley Community Primary School, Cambridge
Somersham Primary School, Somersham
Spaldwick Primary School, Spaldwick
The Spinney Primary School, Cambridge
Spring Meadow Infant School, Ely
Stapleford Community Primary School, Stapleford
Steeple Morden CE Primary School, Steeple Morden
Stilton CE Primary Academy, Stilton
Stretham Community Primary School, Stretham
Stukeley Meadows Primary School, Huntingdon
Sutton CE Primary School, Sutton-in-the-Isle
Swaffham Bulbeck CE Primary School, Swaffham Bulbeck
Swaffham Prior CE Primary School, Swaffham Prior
Swavesey Primary School, Swavesey
Teversham CE Primary School, Teversham
Thomas Eaton Primary Academy, Wimblington
Thongsley Fields Primary and Nursery School, Huntingdon
Thorndown Primary School, St Ives
Thriplow CE Primary School, Thriplow
Townley Primary School, Christchurch
Trumpington Meadows Primary School, Trumpington
Trumpington Park Primary School, Trumpington
University of Cambridge Primary School, Cambridge
Upwood Primary Academy, Upwood
The Vine Inter-Church Primary School, Cambourne
Warboys Primary Academy, Warboys
Waterbeach Community Primary School, Waterbeach
The Weatheralls Primary School, Soham
Westfield Junior School, St Ives
Westwood Primary School, March
Wheatfields Primary School, St Ives
Wilburton CE Primary School, Wilburton
William de Yaxley CE Academy, Yaxley
William Westley CE Primary School, Whittlesford
Willingham Primary School, Willingham
Winhills Primary Academy, St Neots
Wintringham Primary Academy, St Neots
Wisbech St Mary CE Academy, Wisbech St Mary
Wyton on the Hill Primary School, Wyton on the Hill
Yaxley Infant School, Yaxley

Secondary schools

Abbey College, Ramsey
Bassingbourn Village College, Bassingbourn
Bottisham Village College, Bottisham
Cambourne Village College, Cambourne
Cambridge Academy for Science and Technology, Cambridge
Chesterton Community College, Cambridge
Coleridge Community College, Cambridge
Comberton Village College, Comberton
Cottenham Village College, Cottenham
Cromwell Community College, Chatteris
Ely College, Ely
Ernulf Academy, Eynesbury
Hinchingbrooke School, Huntingdon
Impington Village College, Impington
Linton Village College, Linton
Littleport and East Cambridgeshire Academy, Littleport
Longsands Academy, St Neots
Melbourn Village College, Melbourn
Neale-Wade Academy, March
Netherhall School, Cambridge
North Cambridge Academy, Cambridge
Northstowe Secondary College, Northstowe
Parkside Community College, Cambridge
St Bede's School, Cambridge
St Ivo Academy, St Ives
St Peter's School, Huntingdon
Sawston Village College, Sawston
Sawtry Village Academy, Sawtry
Sir Harry Smith Community College, Whittlesey
Soham Village College, Soham
Swavesey Village College, Swavesey
Thomas Clarkson Academy, Wisbech
Trumpington Community College, Cambridge
Witchford Village College, Witchford

Special and alternative schools

Castle School, Cambridge
The Cavendish School, Impington
The Centre School, Cottenham
Granta School, Linton
The Harbour School, Wilburton
Highfield Ely Academy, Ely
Highfield Littleport Academy, Littleport
The Martin Bacon Academy, Northstowe
Meadowgate Academy, Wisbech
Pilgrim PRU, Cambridge
Samuel Pepys School, St Neots
Spring Common Academy, Huntingdon
TBAP Cambridge AP Academy, Cambridge
TBAP Octavia AP Academy, Wisbech
TBAP Unity Academy, St Neots

Further education
Cambridge Regional College, Cambridge
Hills Road Sixth Form College, Cambridge
Huntingdonshire Regional College, Huntingdon
College of West Anglia, Wisbech
Long Road Sixth Form College, Cambridge

Independent schools

Primary and preparatory schools
Alconbury Elementary School, Alconbury
Cambridge Steiner School, Fulbourn
King's College School, Cambridge
Magdalene House, Wisbech
Oaks International School, Cambridge
St Faith's School, Cambridge
Whitehall School, Somersham

Senior and all-through schools

Abbey College Cambridge, Cambridge
Alconbury High School, Alconbury
Cambridge Arts & Sciences, Cambridge
Cardiff Sixth Form College, Cambridge
Heritage School, Cambridge
Kimbolton School, Kimbolton
King's Ely, Ely
Landmark International School, Fulbourn
The Leys School, Cambridge
Mander Portman Woodward, Cambridge
The Perse School, Cambridge
St Andrew's College, Cambridge
St Mary's School, Cambridge
Sancton Wood School, Cambridge
Stephen Perse Foundation, Cambridge
Wisbech Grammar School, Wisbech

Special and alternative schools

Aurora Fairway School, St Ives
Aurora Meldreth Manor School, Meldreth
Begdale House School, Elm
Cambian Home Tree School, Friday Bridge
Cambian Wisbech School, Wisbech
Glebe House, Shudy Camps
Gretton School, Cambridge
Holme Court School, Cambridge
Hope Tree School, Impington
The Old School House, Friday Bridge
On Track Education Centre, Wisbech
The Red Balloon Learner Centre, Cambridge
Shelldene House School, Friday Bridge

References

External links
Schools - Cambridgeshire County Council
Schools in Cambridgeshire data provided by EduBase, Department for Education

Cambridgeshire
 
Lists of buildings and structures in Cambridgeshire